The 'Lundanskaya narrow gauge railway is a narrow-gauge railway in Kirov Oblast, Russia, built as an industrial railway (forest railway) for logging operations.

Current status 
Planning for the railway began in 1948 and building began in 1948–1950. In 1950 regular wood transport on the railway started, between Lundanka and loggings. The Lundanskaya forestry railway's first line was constructed in 1950, in the area of Podosinovsky District in Kirov Oblast from the village Lundanka. The railway operates scheduled freight services from Lundanka, used for forestry tasks such as the transportation of felled logs and forestry workers. In 2017, repairs were made to the track.

Rolling stock

Locomotives 
 TU4 – № 1829, 2144, 2440
 TU6D – № 0385
 Draisine – TD-5u "Pioneer" transportation local residents

Railroad car 
 Tank car
 Passenger car
 Bunk Car "Teplushka"
 Railway log-car and flatcar
 Hopper car to transport track ballast

Work trains 
 Snowplow

See also
Narrow-gauge railways in Russia
List of Russian narrow-gauge railways rolling stock
Kobrinskaya narrow-gauge railway
Oparinskaya narrow-gauge railway

References and sources

External links
 «The site of the railroad» S. Bolashenko 
 Official LLC «Ars-Group» Lundanskaya narrow gauge railway at the VKontakte 
 Lundanka season 2014 at the Znamya newspaper 
 Lundanka LLC «Ars-Group» 2014 at the Znamya newspaper 
 Lundanka LLC «Ars-Group» 2016 at the Znamya newspaper 
 Lundanka LLC «Ars-Group» 2016 at the Znamya newspaper 

750 mm gauge railways in Russia
Railway lines opened in 1950
Logging railways in Russia
Rail transport in Kirov Oblast